HMS Vindictive was a 74-gun third-rate ship of the line of the Royal Navy, built by Nicholas Diddams at Portsmouth Dockyard and launched on 30 November 1813 at Portsmouth.

This huge ship had a crew of 590 men under command of Captain John Toup Nicolas as flagship to Admiral Francis William Austen.

Vindictive was the lead ship of the 40-vessel , indeed she was ordered prior to the design for this class being finalised; however, she was delayed in construction and was not finished until December 1813. With the winding up of the Napoleonic War in prospect, she was not required for active service and was immediately placed in ordinary. Between 1828 and 1833, Vindictive – still in ordinary – was reduced to a 50-gun fourth rate.

Vindictive finally was recommissioned September 1841. On 26 January 1842, she ran aground on The Dean, in the English Channel off the Isle of Wight; she was refloated the next day. She was laid up in ordinary again in June 1848 at Portsmouth. In 1861 she was fitted as a storeship by White of Cowes, and in 1862 she proceeded to Fernando Po, where she took up that role. She foundered there in July 1871, the wreck being sold to be broken up on 24 November 1871.

Notes

References

Lavery, Brian (2003) The Ship of the Line - Volume 1: The development of the battlefleet 1650-1850. Conway Maritime Press. .
Winfield, Rif (2008) British Warships in the Age of Sail 1793-1817: Design, Construction, Careers and Fates. Seaforth Publishing. .

External links
 

 

Ships of the line of the Royal Navy
Vengeur-class ships of the line
1813 ships
Maritime incidents in January 1842
Maritime incidents in July 1871